Men's Downhill World Cup 1979/1980

Final point standings

In Men's Downhill World Cup 1979/80 the best 5 results count.

References
 fis-ski.com

External links
 

World Cup
FIS Alpine Ski World Cup men's downhill discipline titles